According to information compiled by baseball historian Ray Nemec of the Society for American Baseball Research (SABR), the Columbus Buckeyes were a men's baseball team in the International Association during the 1877 season, along with several other American teams and two Canadian teams, the London Tecumsehs and the Guelph Maple Leafs.

Baseball teams established in 1877
Defunct minor league baseball teams
Baseball teams in Columbus, Ohio
Ohio State League teams
Defunct baseball teams in Ohio
Baseball teams disestablished in 1877
1877 establishments in Ohio